The 295th Khersonskaya order of Lenin Red Banner order of Suvorov Motorised Rifle Division (Russian: 295-я мотострелковая Херсонская ордена Ленина Краснознамённая ордена Суворова дивизия) (Military Unit: 39486) was a division of the Soviet Ground Forces. It was based in Baku for its entire existence. It was formed in 1964 from the former 49th Motor Rifle Division, which had been the 49th Rifle Division. The 1965 change in designation restored its historic Second World War numerical designation.

It formed part of the 4th Army.

Comprised 298th Tank Regiment (Gyuzhdek/Гюждек), 139th Motor Rifle Regiment (Kusary), and 135th (with BTR) and 140th Motor Rifle Regiments (with BMP), both based in Baku.

It was disbanded in June 1992 and the equipment was handed over to Azerbaijan.

Commanders 
Dorofeev, Alexander Petrovich (01.10.1941-27.03.1942), Colonel wounded;
Sklyarov, Sergey Fedorovich (28.03.1942 — 11.06.1942), Colonel;
Safaryan, Nver Georgievich (15.06.1942-28.12.1942), Colonel;
Petukhov, Viktor Ivanovich (29.12.1942 — 08.01.1943), Colonel;
Filatov, Alexander Alekseevich (09.01.1943-06.04.1943), Major General;
Krasnovsky, Serafim Andrianovich (07.04.1943 — 10.06.1943), Colonel;
Dorofeev, Alexander Petrovich (11.06.1943-08.07.1947), Colonel, from 03.06.1944 Major General.

References
 Michael Holm, 295th Motor Rifle Division

Motor rifle divisions of the Soviet Union
Military units and formations established in 1965
Military units and formations disestablished in 1992